Fabián Alberto Garfagnoli (born 17 August 1970 in Santa Fe) is a former Argentine footballer. He is a member of the backroom staff at Tiro Federal.

Garfagnoli started his professional career with Newell's Old Boys in 1987, he was part of championship winning teams in his early years at the club. In 1996, he moved to Argentinos Juniors and helped them to win the Argentine 2nd division in 1996–1997. He stayed with the club until 2002 when he moved to Tiro Federal.

Titles

Coaching career

Garfagnoli became a youth team coach at Tiro Federal where he had one game as interim manager of the first team in 2007.

References

External links
 Argentine Primera statistics

1970 births
Living people
Footballers from Santa Fe, Argentina
Argentine footballers
Association football defenders
Newell's Old Boys footballers
Argentinos Juniors footballers
Tiro Federal footballers
Argentine Primera División players